Valentyne Suite was the second album released by the band Colosseum. It was Vertigo Records' first album release, and reached number 15 in the UK Albums Chart in 1969. The album peaked at number 18 in Australia in 1970.

Though the song "The Kettle" is officially listed as having been written by Dick Heckstall-Smith and Jon Hiseman, a credit which is confirmed by Hiseman's liner notes for the album, bassist and producer Tony Reeves later claimed that it was written by guitarist and vocalist James Litherland. The song's riff was later interpolated in three songs, notably "Ya Mama" by Fatboy Slim.

Reception

 
AllMusic derided the first three tracks, referring to "The Kettle" and "Butty's Blues" as, "tarted-up 12-bar blues", and claiming that "Elegy" was beyond James Litherland's abilities as a vocalist. They were more approving of the rest of the album, and described Dave Greenslade's solo on "The Valentyne Suite" as, "something to offer a challenge to vintage Keith Emerson, but with swing." They were critical of Litherland and Reeves's playing on the song, however, and concluded, "In retrospect this might not quite the classic it seemed at the time, but it remains listenable..."

Track listing
Valentyne Suite was originally written with "Beware the Ides of March" as the final movement, but since "Beware the Ides of March" had already been released in the UK on Those Who Are About to Die Salute You, "The Grass is Always Greener" was substituted for the final movement in the UK release. Compact Disc issues of the suite follow the track listing of the UK release.

Personnel

Colosseum
Dave Greenslade – Hammond organ, vibraphone, piano, backing vocal on "The Machine Demands a Sacrifice"
Dick Heckstall-Smith – saxophones, flute on "The Machine Demands a Sacrifice"
Jon Hiseman – drums, machine on "The Machine Demands a Sacrifice"
James Litherland – guitars, lead vocals
Tony Reeves – bass guitars

Guest musicians
Neil Ardley – conductor on "Butty's Blues", string arrangement on "Elegy"

References

1969 albums
Colosseum (band) albums
Vertigo Records albums
Bronze Records albums
Albums produced by Gerry Bron
Albums arranged by Neil Ardley
Albums conducted by Neil Ardley